Charles Babcock Earle (March 31, 1884 – March 14, 1945) was a Negro leagues pitcher and manager for several years before the founding of the first Negro National League.

Early life
An early mention of Charles Earle in the Meriden papers was his membership in the First Congregational Church of Meriden in 1895 "There was singing by a quartet of boys from the First Congregational Church (of Meriden)" which included Charles Earle (Age 11). Also, in July 1901, "J. W. Logan and the First Congregational Sunday school boys, who camped out at Westbrook for two weeks, have returned home" including Charles Earle. (Age 17)

Meriden High School Academic and Athletic Career
Charles Babcock Earle had an outstanding academic and athletic career at MHS from 1901 to his graduation in 1904. He starred in football and baseball for each of his four years. He missed the 1902 football season because of typhoid fever. As one reporter wrote on October 4, 1902 in the Meriden Daily Journal, "CHARLES EARLE GETTING BETTER. Many friends of Charles Earle, thought to be the "greatest halfback the MHS ever had," have visited him at the Meriden hospital this week and report that Earle is fast regaining his lost health and will soon be able to be out. At present he is able to sit in a chair. Earle has been very ill with typhoid fever and at one time there was little hope for his ultimate recovery but he will probably not be well enough to get into the game this year.

The "doughty little back" was taken ill during vacation and went to see a doctor. The physician told him that he would probably be quite ill and advised him to go to the hospital. The next day Earle started for the institution on foot and when he arrived there he went to bed. Up to a few days ago he had not left his bed since his sickness. He is a mere shadow of himself but that is to be expected after his prolonged illness. He has "many admirers" at the school and outside and they have kept him well supplied with flowers and reading matter.

"He is grateful to his friends and says that he never knew he had so many before." and "It is doubtful if Earle's work of last year will ever again be repeated on the gridiron."  Sensational runs the length of the field were common occurrences with him and a timely run has won more games for the High School than any time before Earle was on the team.

Academically, it was noted that Charles was excused from taking the freshman algebra final exam in June. (This meant he had at least an 85 average in his class work for the year). Also, although 40 students failed to advance to the next level, he was promoted from freshman to sophomore.

According to an article by John L. Sullivan in the "Morning Record," the class of 1904 voted Charles Earle the best athlete and the most popular student.

Sportswriter Harry Daniels named Earle to his 1909 "All American Team" saying he "is the best hitter in baseball, a sure fielder."

He appears to have played most seasons for the Brooklyn Royal Giants. During his career, he played with many popular players of the day, including Bill Monroe, Home Run Johnson, Al Robinson, Harry Buckner, George Wright, Dick Wallace, Judy Gans, String Bean Williams, Louis Santop, Dizzy Dismukes, and Bill Pettus.

Earle died at the age of 60 in New York, New York.

References

External links

Negro league baseball managers
Lincoln Giants players
Philadelphia Giants players
Brooklyn Royal Giants players
Bacharach Giants players
People from Meriden, Connecticut
1884 births
1945 deaths
20th-century African-American people